Flagship Entertainment Group is a film production company based in Hong Kong and a joint venture between Warner Bros. Discovery and a China Media Capital–led consortium established in 2015 that includes TVB.

Previously, Warner was in a joint venture, the production and distribution company Warner China Film HG, with state-owned China Film Group and Hengdian Group, owner of Hengdian World Studios from 2006 to 2009.

History
Flagship Entertainment Group's establishment was announced in September 2015. Talks to form the joint venture were confirmed to be under way in August 2015. The company announced its first slate of 12 films in March 2016, with the first film scheduled for release in 2016.

Filmography
When Larry Met Mary (Wen Zhang, 2016)
Mission Milano (Wong Jing, 2016)
The Adventurers (Stephen Fung, 2017)
Paradox (Wilson Yip, 2017) 
The Meg (Jon Turteltaub, 2018)
Wish Dragon (Chris Appelhans, 2021)
Meg 2: The Trench (Ben Wheatley, 2023)

References

Mass media companies established in 2015
Film production companies of Hong Kong
2015 establishments in Hong Kong
Warner Bros.
Joint ventures